Al Downing may refer to:
Alvin Joseph Downing (1916–2000), jazz musician
Al Downing (baseball) (born 1941), pitcher
Al Downing (musician) (1940–2005), entertainer, singer, songwriter, and pianist